Daimler Double-Six piston engine was a sleeve-valve V12 engine manufactured by The Daimler Company Limited of Coventry, England between 1926 and 1938 in four different sizes for their flagship cars.

The colossus of roads

Daimler required an advanced new model to compete with Rolls-Royce's New Phantom of 1925. Though Packard had introduced its Twin-Six many years earlier it was to be a decade or more before luxury manufacturers like Rolls-Royce, Hispano-Suiza, Lincoln, Voisin and Lagonda made their own (and Packard returned to it). In fact by the mid-1930s flexible engine mountings and improved carburation had made so many cylinders unnecessary. What did return them to a certain level of popularity was the push for higher performance requiring higher crankshaft speeds. Daimler introduced their first 26 hp straight-eight in mid-1934 and their last (poppet valve) V12s were built in 1937 or 1938.

From 1929 Daimler Double-Sixes were distinguishable from the six-cylinder cars by a chromium bar down the centre of the radiator. A similar distinguishing mark was placed on the later Jaguar-made versions.

Aside from Daimler only Voisin in France ever attempted production of a sleeve-valve V12 engine. Voisin's production—between 1929 and 1937—was "minimal and spasmodic".

The same Daimler Double-Six name was used for the badge-engineered Daimler V12 engine used in the largest Daimlers between 1972 and 1997. Lofty England, a Daimler apprentice 1927–1932, joined Jaguar in 1946 and became its chief executive. He ensured the Double-Six name was used for the Jaguar V12 when installed in Daimler cars.

Design
This engine was designed by consultant Chief Engineer L H Pomeroy (1883-1941) to achieve high power with quietness and, particularly, smoothness. Pomeroy made the engine by taking the cylinder blocks of two  existing 25/85 hp Daimler engines and putting them on a common crankcase. Pomeroy was to be appointed managing director in 1929. The same design was produced in different sizes depending on the different engine displacements.

7.1-litre Double-Six 50

Engine
Announced 15 October 1926 and observed by The Observer's motoring correspondent to be Britain's first twelve-cylinder car engine.
Bore and stroke 81.5 mm x 114 mm gave a swept volume of
7136 cc

Power output  @ 2480 rpm.Tax rating 50 hp 
 Cylinders arranged in blocks of three
 Pistons were of light alloy and split-skirted "like the modern girl"
 Double light steel sleeves controlled the inlet of fuel and the outlet of exhaust, they were operated by short connecting rods from their eccentric-shafts
 Separately detachable cylinder heads
 60 degree angle V
 Crankcase aluminium
 The big-ends lay in pairs, the right-hand ones forked so that diagonal pairs of cylinders were in the same plane
 Connecting rods were H-section
 Crankshaft ran in seven bearings and had an external Lanchester-type vibration damper at the front
 Two sleeve-operating eccentric-shafts were driven by chain at the rear of the engine each ran in four bearings
 Daimler seven-jet carburettor, water-pump, magneto, exhaust pipe and silencer were duplicated, each block of cylinders having its own components
 Petrol was supplied to a reservoir by the engine from the rear-mounted tank by air pressure
 Each Daimler carburettor had an independent pre-heated air supply and four jets plus a primer which acted as a pilot with a separate air supply
 Inlet manifolds were water-heated and mounted on the outside of each cylinder block
 With the primer lubricant was passed to the cylinders and with the depression of the starter pedal oil delivered to the lower end of the sleeves
 Oil was forced to the main and big-end bearings, the sleeve-shafts and the sleeves
 Oil was cooled through a radiator

 6a 5a 4a 3a 2a 1a
 1b 2b 3b 4b 5b 6b
order of firing: 1b 1a, 5b 5a, 3b 3a, 6b 6a, 2b 2a, 4b 4a
 Dual ignition was fitted
 Distributors were coupled as were all the change-over switches from the coil to magneto ignition
 Magnetos and water pumps were driven through transverse shafts by skew gearing from the nose of the crankshaft
 Dynamo operated by silent chain
 Two vertical shafts from the same source drove contact breakers and distributors set above the cylinder banks
 Belt-driven four-bladed radiator fan
 Fuel was pumped from the rear tank by air pressure from a mechanical pump mounted near the carburettor
The exhaust pipes passed through the V of the cylinder blocks and were covered with an aluminium plate  to dissipate heat.
The engine and clutch were mounted as a unit separately from the gearbox

The result was an engine which idled at 150 rpm and ran with uncanny silence "the only audible sound made by a Double-Six (if you opened the bonnet and went right up to it) was the almost imperceptible tick as the ignition points opened and the faint breathing of the carburettor".

This largest engine faded from the catalogue after 1930

Chassis
 Chassis frame was channel section
 Gearbox: driven through a single dry plate disc clutch mounted on the engine a separate four-speeds and reverse gearbox was mounted on a very substantial cross-member and controlled by a central ball-gate gear lever.
 Hand brake operated shoes in a brake drum mounted at the back of the gearbox
 Power was taken by open propeller-shaft with metal universal joints to a (virtually silent) underslung worm-drive to the rear axle
 Suspension was by gaitered half-elliptic leaf springs - beneath the axle at the back
 Brakes on four wheels were rod-operated with assistance from a Dewandre vacuum servo positioned beside the gearbox. Adjustment could be made by hand
 Steering: the width of the engine necessitated mounting the worm and sector reduction box on the scuttle. From there a coupling lever dropped to a bell-crank pivoted on the chassis side-member. A normal drag-link ran to the front axle.
 Wheelbase:
Type O wheelbase  Track 
Type P wheelbase  Track 
Type W wheelbase  Track 
 Tyres:
 x  or
 x  or
 x 
 Dimensions of standard saloon de luxe:
Length 
 Width 
Height

Prices
 Chassis prices: Type O £1,850, Type P £1,950, Type W £1,950
 Standard saloon de luxe by Daimler £2,450
 Standard enclosed limousine by Daimler £2,800

3.7-litre Double-Six 30

Announced 1 August 1927. Formed around a pair of 16/55 cylinder blocks
Bore and stroke 65 mm x 94 mm gave a swept volume of
3744 cc

Power output ,Tax rating 31.4 hp

Design change
Petrol was lifted to a reservoir by the engine from the rear-mounted tank by Autovac

 Wheelbase:
Type Q wheelbase  Track 
Type M wheelbase  Track 
Type V wheelbase  Track 
Type O wheelbase  Track 
 Tyres:
 x  on the coupé tested by The Times
 Dimensions of standard saloon:
Length 
 Width 
Height

Prices
 Chassis prices:
 Standard saloon by Daimler £1.300

Production ended in 1932, none with fluid flywheel and pre-selector gearbox.

5.3-litre Double-Six 30/40 or Light Double-Six
Announced October 1930 and matched with the new Daimler fluid flywheel  and Wilson pre-selective half-automatically changing four-speed gearbox.
Bore and stroke 73 mm x 104 mm gave a swept volume of
5296 cc

Tax rating 40.18 hp

In November 1930 a car was shipped to Edsel Ford with the new Daimler transmission. It aroused so much interest Cadillac's chief engineer, Ernest Seaholm, came to the following Olympia show and bought another for technical investigation. It inspired Earl Thompson, who invented syncromesh, to develop the Hydramatic transmission.

This light double-six was one of the first cars designed using ergonomics. Switches buttons and stalks were all placed within finger tip reach of the driver and accessible without taking hands from the wheel. The cars would run up to  before requiring engine decarbonisation.

Design changes
Engine
Cylinder block a one-piece light alloy casting
Distributors were moved to the back of the engine
Cover plates provided in the crankcase which could be removed to reveal the sleeve-eccentric links
Carburettors moved forward
Lubrication by two submerged helical-gear pumps, one feeding all moving parts, the other circulating oil through the oil radiator
Oil radiator to maintain a constant 
Cold viscid oil forced open valves allowing oil into troughs below the big-ends to provide cold-start splash lubrication of the sleeves
Hand-operated oil cleaner
Water pumps on outside of each cylinder bank mounted in tandem with dynamos
This model was usually supplied with a taller and more slender radiator.

Chassis
Grouped chassis lubrication
Back axle incorporating dip-stick cum oiling syringe
Hydraulic shock absorbers
 Wheelbase:
Short wheelbase  Track 
Medium wheelbase  Track 
Long wheelbase  Track

Prices
 Chassis prices: Short £1,100, Medium £1,200, Long £1,350
 Short wheelbase standard saloon by Daimler from £1,600
 Medium wheelbase limousine by Daimler from £1,900
 Long wheelbase limousine by Daimler from £2,300

6.5-litre Double-Six 40/50

Announced October 1930 and matched with the new Daimler Fluid Flywheel and Wilson pre-selective half-automatically changing four-speed gearbox.
Bore and stroke 81.5 mm x 104 mm gave a swept volume of
6511 cc

Tax rating 49.4 hp

Cylinder block a one-piece light alloy casting

Double-Six 40/50 with poppet valves
From 1935 to 1938 nine Double-Six 40/50 engines were made with poppet valves - possibly to use surplus components.

Performance
The Autocar reported in April 1927 the big cars needed no other gears once they were rolling, even climbing a hill. Petrol consumption was not so savage as might have been expected at 10 miles per gallon. "2 to 82 mph in top gear in the highest degree of smoothness and quietness" said The Autocar ". . . fortunate beings will leisurely survey the moving surface of the earth through the windows of their Daimler Double-Sixes as they pass onward in silent dignity".

A letter from Tony Bird in the January 1967 issue of Motor Sport recounted how Double-Six models could develop violent front axle "wheel wobble" which could only be overcome by stopping the car.

Bodies
Bodies were all mounted after the Daimler pattern on a separate frame flexibly held.

Presence
A contemporary press report remarked that "when the Double-Six arrives at the door there is no obvious pomp and circumstance. Here is a car that looks clean-cut and aristocratic in its speckless grey paintwork. It is not until one comes close to the car that its great size is realised. The Daimler bonnet is nearly level with the chin of the observer." Autocar

Difficulties
William Boddy of Motor Sport commented that the difficulty with sleeve valves was lubrication. So much oil near the combustion chambers led to a gummy engine prone to seize if left standing for any length of time. Attempts to tow-start  invariably led to sleeve-driving link breakage if not damage to the sleeves. There was also difficulty in timing the sleeves once pistons had been out of the block and also synchronising carburation and ignition between the two banks of cylinders.

Daimler introduced their new Straight-Eight in 1934 and Double-Sixes slipped slowly from the catalogue.

Notes

Footnotes

Citations

References

External links

Images not otherwise available
 Double-Six hire car and driver and another Daimler, 1937
 Double-Six 50 four-seater drophead coupé
YouTube
 Double-Six Thirty coupé on the road
 Double-Six Fifty on the road

Double-Six sleeve-valve V12
Gasoline engines by model
Sleeve valve engines